Sabalan (Sabalân) was a Palestinian Arab village in the Safad Subdistrict, located  northwest of Safad. In 1945, Sabalan had a population of 70. It was depopulated during the 1948 Palestine War.

History
In 1881,  the PEF's Survey of Western Palestine (SWP)   described Neby Sebelan as "a village, built of stone, surrounding the tomb of the Neby Sebalan; containing about 100 Moslems; on top of high hill, with figs, olives, and arable land. There are four good springs to the east, besides cisterns." Some believe Sabalan is supposed to be Zebulun, the son of Jacob, while others claim he was a da'is ("missionary") who joined the Druze religion and helped promote it in the region. Archaeological artifacts, namely rock-cut tombs are located near the tomb.

A population list from about 1887 showed  Nebi Abu Sebalan to have  about 75 inhabitants; all  Muslims.

British Mandate era
In the British Mandate period, it had a circular plan with most of its houses being closely clustered together. Because of the steep slopes that surrounded Sabalan, the village was only able to expand on its northwestern end. Although the tomb of Nabi Sabalan was sacred to the Druze,  At the centre of the village  stood a mosque.

In the 1922 census of Palestine  Sabalan  had a population of 68; all Muslim,  increasing in  the 1931 census, to  94 Muslims, in 18  houses.

By the 1945 statistics the population was  70 Muslims,  with a total of 1,798 dunams of land, according to an official land and population survey. Of this, a total of 421 dunums were used for cereals; 144 dunums were irrigated or used for plantations,  while a 14 dunams were built-up (urban) area.

1948, aftermath
On October 30, 1948, during the Israeli offensive Operation Hiram, Sabalan was captured. Units of Israel's Golani Brigade overran the village with support from the Sheva Brigade as they were advancing along the road leading from Suhmata and Sa'sa'. No Jewish localities were built on village lands,  According to Palestinian historian, Walid Khalidi, "Only one village house and a well remain." The remaining house is occupied by the Druze guards and caretakers of the Nabi Sabalan tomb and new buildings were constructed to accommodate pilgrims and visitors. In 1965, Druze youth activists led by Samih al-Qasim protested the confiscation of the lands surrounding the tomb by the Israeli government which declared them "state lands." The Druze religious leadership established Eid al-Nabi Sabalan ("Feast of the Prophet Sabalan") in 1971.

Today, the lands of the village, including the holy shrine, were annexed to the Druze town of Hurfeish. A neighborhood for released soldiers was built there.

References

Bibliography

External links
Welcome To Sabalan
Sabalan,  Zochrot
 Saabalan, Villages of Palestine
Sabalan, from the Khalil Sakakini Cultural Center
The story of Sabalan, 24/10/2008, Zochrot
Survey of Western Palestine, Map 4:   IAA, Wikimedia commons 

Druze holy places
Arab villages depopulated during the 1948 Arab–Israeli War
District of Safad
Ziyarat
Religious buildings and structures in Israel